The Beit Professorship of Commonwealth History is one of the senior professorships in history at the University of Oxford.  It was established in 1905 as the Beit Professorship of Colonial History. It is the first imperial professorship in the United Kingdom. The post is held in conjunction with a fellowship at Balliol College, Oxford.

Beit Professors
Hugh Egerton (1905–1920)
Sir Reginald Coupland (1920–1948)
Vincent T. Harlow (1950–1963)
John Andrew Gallagher (1963–1971)
Ronald Robinson (1971–1987)
Judith M. Brown (1990–2011)
James Belich (2011–)

References

Commonwealth History, Beit
Commonwealth History, Beit
Balliol College, Oxford
1905 establishments in England
Lists of people associated with the University of Oxford